Montenegrin volleyball clubs are participating in the CEV competitions since the season 1995–96. 
First team which ever competed at the European cups was OK Budućnost Podgorica. Except them, in CEV competitions played also OK Budvanska Rivijera Budva, OK Sutjeska Nikšić, OK Jedinstvo Bijelo Polje and OK Studentski Centar Podgorica.
Among other competitions, OK Budućnost and OK Budvanska Rivijera played a numerous seasons in CEV Champions League, with few participations in the final phases of competition.

List of matches
Below is a list of games of all Montenegrin clubs in CEV competitions.

Performances by clubs
During the overall history, five different Montenegrin clubs played in CEV competitions.

As of the end of CEV competitions 2019–20 season.

Scores by competitions
Until now, Montenegrin volleyball clubs played in CEV Champions League, CEV Cup and CEV Challenge Cup.
Below is the list of performances of Montenegrin clubs in every single European volleyball competition.

As of the end of CEV competitions 2019–20 season.

Opponents by countries
Below is the list of performances of Montenegrin clubs against opponents in CEV competitions by their countries (volleyball federations).

As of the end of CEV competitions 2017–18 season.

See also
 Montenegrin Volleyball League
 Montenegrin volleyball Cup
 Volleyball Federation of Montenegro (OSCG)

External links
 Volleyball Federation of Montenegro

Volleyball in Montenegro